Grape seed oil (also called grapeseed oil or grape oil) is a vegetable oil derived from the seeds of grapes. A by-product of the winemaking industry, it is typically used for edible applications.

Uses

Cooking 
Due to its clean, light taste, and high polyunsaturated fat content, it may be used as an ingredient in salad dressings and mayonnaise and as a base for oil infusions of garlic, rosemary, or other herbs or spices. It is widely used in baked goods, pancakes, and waffles. It is sprayed on raisins to help them retain their flavor.

Research 

A study of 21 grape cultivars showed variation of oil composition, especially for linoleic acid and tocopherols.

Although grape seeds contain polyphenols, such as proanthocyanidins, grape seed oil contains negligible amounts of these compounds. Grape seed oil components are under study for their potential applications in human health, but the scientific quality of clinical research as of 2016 has been inadequate to suggest any effect on lowering disease risk.

Possible contamination 
Grapeseed oil has occasionally been found to contain dangerous levels of polycyclic aromatic hydrocarbons because of direct contact with combustion gases during the drying process.

Production 
Winemaking accounts for 90% of grape cultivation, with the seeds of the plant serving as a by-product that can be pressed for oil. Grapeseed oil production primarily occurs in wine-growing regions, especially around the Mediterranean Sea.

Composition 

The following table lists a typical fatty acid composition of grape seed oil:

Grape seed oil also contains 0.8 to 1.5% unsaponifiables rich in phenols (tocopherols) and steroids (campesterol, beta-sitosterol, stigmasterol). Grapeseed oil contains small amounts of vitamin E, but safflower oil, cottonseed oil, or rice bran oil contain greater amounts. Grapeseed oil is high in polyunsaturates and low in saturated fat.

Comparison to other vegetable oils

See also
 List of grape varieties
 List of grape dishes

References 

Aromatherapy
Cooking oils
Vegetable oils
Pet foods
Grape dishes